James Douglas, 9th Earl of Douglas, 3rd Earl of Avondale KG (1426–1491) was a Scottish nobleman, last of the 'Black' earls of Douglas.

Early life 
The son of James the Gross, 7th Earl of Douglas, by his wife Lady Beatrice Sinclair, daughter to Henry II Sinclair, Earl of Orkney; Douglas was a twin, the older by a few minutes, the younger being Archibald Douglas, Earl of Moray.

He succeeded to the earldom on the murder of his brother William Douglas, 8th Earl of Douglas by King James II and his entourage. He denounced his brother's murderers and took up arms against the king, and he and his brothers attacked Stirling, driving a horse through the town with the safe conduct given to William attached to its tail. He was forced to back down when some allies deserted him.

He obtained a papal dispensation to marry his brother's widow, Margaret Douglas, Fair Maid of Galloway, in order to keep the family estates together. It is not entirely clear that this marriage ever took place, but it was certainly planned. He was involved in intrigues with the English court, and in 1455 rebelled against James II once more.

Rebellion and exile in England 
Meanwhile, another branch of the Douglas family, known as the Red Douglases, had risen into importance, and George Douglas, 4th Earl of Angus, great-grandson of the first earl of Douglas, took sides with the king against the Earl of Douglas. Douglas, again deserted by his chief allies, fled to England, and his three younger brothers, Hugh Douglas, Earl of Ormonde, Archibald Douglas, Earl of Moray, and John Douglas, Lord of Balvenie, were defeated at the Battle of Arkinholm, near Langholm on the Esk, possibly by Angus. Moray was killed, Ormonde taken prisoner and executed, and Balvenie escaped to England. Their last stronghold, Threave Castle in Galloway, fell. James Douglas was attainted in 1455, and his lands and estates were forfeit to the crown. The lands of the Douglases were divided among their rivals, the lordship of Douglas falling to the Red Douglas 4th earl of Angus.

From England, the Earl of Douglas continued to intrigue against James III of Scotland; he was employed by Edward IV in 1461 to negotiate a league at Ardtornish with the western highlanders to take the nine-year old's kingdom for England. At some point he was made a Knight of the Garter. Following his attainder his first wife divorced him (if they ever married) so he married again to Anne Holland, daughter of John Holland, 2nd Duke of Exeter.

Capture and death 
In 1484 he was taken prisoner at the battle of Lochmaben Fair, and was relegated to Lindores Abbey, where he died in or after 1491.

References

Sources

peerage website

|-

1426 births
1491 deaths
Earls of Douglas
James Douglas, 9th Earl of Douglas
Knights of the Garter
Scottish twins